Jub Gowhar-e Sofla (also Romanized as Jūb Gowhar-e Soflá and Jūbgowhar-e Soflá; also known as Deh-e Jān ‘Alī and Jūb Gabar) is a village in Nabovat Rural District, in the Central District of Eyvan County, Ilam Province, Iran. At the 2006 census, its population was 78, in 14 families. The village is populated by Kurds.

References 

Populated places in Eyvan County
Kurdish settlements in Ilam Province